Wake Me When It's Over is the second album by Faster Pussycat, released in 1989. The band moved away from the glam metal of their first album to a more blues-influenced sound.

Music videos were produced for "Poison Ivy" and "House of Pain". "House of Pain" reached No. 28 on the Billboard Hot 100, and the video, which was directed by future film director Michael Bay, was in rotation on MTV. The album peaked at No. 48 on the Billboard 200. The album has been certified gold by the RIAA.

Production
The album was produced by John Jansen. It is marked by a heavier, less glam metal sound.

Critical reception
Spin wrote that "side one is terrible, crammed with constipated glam-metal boogie, "but praised side two's "Slip of the Tongue" and "Tattoo". The St. Petersburg Times wrote that "by smoothing out the rough edges and tightening up the loose performances, Faster Pussycat has traded in its identity for a faceless, albeit commercial, sound." The Calgary Herald thought that "a pleasant surprise is "House of Pain", which is devoid of the syrupy mush that tends to dominate a lot of ballads that crack the charts." Kirk Blows of Music Week called Wake Me When It's Over worthwhile, and noticed that the album gives listeners "more adventure, variety and depth than its predecessor while retaining just enough of the reckless spirit."

Track listing

Personnel

Faster Pussycat
 Taime Downe – lead vocal
 Greg Steele – guitar, piano, backing vocal
 Brent Muscat – guitar, percussion, backing vocal, talk box on "Little Dove"
 Eric Stacy – electric and fretless bass
 Mark Michals – drums, percussion

Additional musicians
 Emi Canyn – vocals
 Jimmy Zavala – harmonica, saxophone
 Kevin Savigar – piano and keyboards
 Steven Riley – drums, percussion, backing vocals

Production
 Produced and mixed by John Jansen
 Recorded and engineered by Ryan Dorn, Ross Hogarth, John Jansen and Rod O'Brien
 Assistant engineers: Nelson Ayres, Kyle Bess, Michael Bosley and David Knight
 Mastered by Greg Calbi

Charts

Album

Singles

House of Pain

Certifications

See also
List of glam metal albums and songs

References

1989 albums
Faster Pussycat albums
Elektra Records albums